Horná Ves is a village and municipality in Žiar nad Hronom District in the Banská Bystrica Region of central Slovakia.

Genealogical resources

The records for genealogical research are available at the state archive "Statny Archiv in Banska Bystrica, Slovakia"

 Roman Catholic church records (births/marriages/deaths): 1674-1913 (parish B)

See also
 List of municipalities and towns in Slovakia

External links
Surnames of living people in Horna Ves

Villages and municipalities in Žiar nad Hronom District